Gran Hermano del Pacífico is a television program produced by Endemol. It involved 3 countries within South America (Ecuador, Chile and Peru).
The first season started on 11 June 2005 and finished on 24 September 2005 with a total duration of 106 days. The house was located in Bogotá, Colombia. 18 housemates entered the house and the winner was Juan Sebastián and the finalist was Leito.  There are no plans for a second season.

Housemates

Nominations Table

Notes:
 The maximum number of Housemates that can be Nominated at any one time is three. If there is a tie the Housemate with the most Nominations so far in the game is Nominated. This Week Leito (6) and Pamela (6) were Nominated, and Gabriela, José and Juan drew next with 3 each. José had the most Nominations so far (including all Weeks) and was hence Nominated. However, last Week's Evictee Roberto was given the chance to save one of the Nominated Housemates and chose to save José, meaning that Gabriela took up his place in the Nomination line-up.
 Claudio, Juan and Leito were initially Nominated, however Pamela saved Juan and José dropped into his place.
 This Week Housemates Nominated in four teams of three. Teams were as follows: Bertha, Jarén and Leito (Yellow Team), Gabriela, Juan and Romina (Blue Team), Gianmarco, Jessica and Teobaldo (Purple Team) and José, Liliana and Viviana (Orange Team). Each team Nominated together, and their two Nominations counted for just one point each. Bethra, José and Juan were Nominated, and evictee Claudio decided not to save any of them.
 José, Leito and Viviana were initially Nominated. Evictee Betha saved Leito, and Teobaldo took her place with the next highest number of Nominations (3).
 This Week the first four Evictees (Bertha, Claudio, Pamela and Roberto) were allowed one Nomination each. They chose Toebaldo (Bertha), Viviana (Claudio), Gianmarco (Pamela) and Liliana (Roberto). Gianmarco, Juan and Leito were initially Nominated, but José-Luis (Evictee number five) chose to save Gianmarco, and Viviana took their place.
 Gianmarco, Leito  and Liliana were initially nominated, however Viviana saved Leito and Juan took their place.
 This Week the Housemates Nominated in eight groups of two, depending upon with of the Pacifico countries they came from. Each Housemate nominated twice, in two different pairs. Gianmarco, Jarén and Juan Sebastián were Nominated, and Evitee Liliana chose not to save any of them.
 Shortly following Liliana's Eviction three new Housemates (Augusto, Katia and Kattya) moved into the Secret Garden. Jessica had to Evict one of them, and chose Katia.
 Jarén, Leito and Teobaldo were initially Nominated, and as Gianmarco chose not to save any of them, they all faced the Public Vote.
 New Housemates Augusto and Kattya were Immune, and could Nominate but not be Nominated. Jarén, Juan-Sebastián and Leito were Nominated and Teobaldo chose not to save any of them.
 Augusto, Kattya and Romina were Nominated, and after Jarén saved Romina Leito took their place.
 All Housemates were automatically Nominated. The Housemate with the least save votes would leave the House, and the next two Housemates with the least save votes would enter the Secret Garden. Kattya had the least save votes and was Evicted. Jessica and Romina were the two next least popular Housemates and entered the Secret Garden.
 Viewers were given the choice of five Evicted Housemates to return to the House for the final Week (Gianmarco, Jarén, Liliana, Teobaldo and Viviana). The three with the most votes would return to the House. The Public chose Teobaldo (29.79%), Jarén (23.89%) and Gianmarco (22.69%) to return and they re-entered after Kattya's Eviction and Jessica & Romina's fake Evictions. Lilliana (19.26%) and Viviana (4.37%) missed out on the chance to return.
 The two Housemates moved to the Secret Garden (Jessica & Romina) faced the Public Vote, and only one of them could return for the final night.
 Of the three returned Evicted Housemates only one could stay for the final night and hence Gianmarco, Jarén and Teobaldo all faced the Public vote. The one of them with the most save votes would stay in the House for final night.
 The final five Housemates all automatically faced the Public Vote to win.

References

External links

2005 Ecuadorian television seasons
Big Brother (franchise)
2005 Chilean television series debuts
2005 Chilean television series endings
2005 Peruvian television series debuts
2005 Peruvian television series endings
2000s Chilean television series
2000s Peruvian television series
2005 Chilean television seasons
2005 Peruvian television seasons
Television shows filmed in Colombia